The two degree target is the international climate policy goal of limiting global warming to less than two degrees Celsius by 2100 compared to the pre-industrialization level. It is an integral part of the Paris climate agreement. This objective is a political determination based on scientific knowledge concerning the probable consequences of global warming, which dates from the Copenhagen Conference in 2009. It is criticized as insufficient, because even a warming of two degrees will have serious consequences for humans and the environment, as demonstrated in particular by the IPCC Special Report on the consequences of a global warming of 1,5°C.

See also 

 Anthropocene
 Keeling Curve
 Eco-sufficiency

References 

Climate change policy
Climate change